Tremoctopus gelatus, the gelatinous blanket octopus, is a species of octopod formally described by Thomas in 1977. The length of T. gelatus is unknown. The gelatinous blanket octopus lives in pelagic subtropical waters of the Atlantic Ocean.

References 

Octopuses
Molluscs described in 1977
Molluscs of the Atlantic Ocean